Tod Highway is an important 177 kilometre highway serving South Australia's Eyre Peninsula's wheatbelt, and is designated route B90. It is named after Robert Tod who explored the area in 1839.

Route
Tod Highway begins from Eyre Highway at Kyancutta and runs directly south, through Lock and Cummins to Flinders Highway, 25km west of Port Lincoln, practically dividing the Eyre Peninsula right down the middle into eastern and western halves. The highway passes through wheat, barley, wool and livestock farms, and provides access to grain terminals in Port Lincoln.

Major intersections

See also
 Tod Reservoir

References

Highways in South Australia
Eyre Peninsula